Marie Blandine Ouédraogo Sawadogo is a member of the Pan-African Parliament from Burkina Faso.

Sawadogo is a member of the National Assembly of Burkina Faso representing the Congress for Democracy and Progress party. She was elected to the Pan-African Parliament in 2004.

See also
 List of members of the Pan-African Parliament

References

External links
 National Assembly biography

Year of birth missing (living people)
Living people
Members of the Pan-African Parliament from Burkina Faso
Burkinabé women in politics
21st-century women politicians
Women members of the Pan-African Parliament
21st-century Burkinabé people